Sarah Forster (born 19 May 1993) is a Swiss ice hockey player and member of the Swiss national team,  playing in the Premier Hockey Federation (PHF) with the Metropolitan Riveters. A three-time Olympian, she won a bronze medal with Switzerland in the women’s ice hockey tournament at the 2014 Winter Olympics and competed in the women’s ice hockey tournament at the 2018 Winter Olympics and the women’s ice hockey tournament at the 2022 Winter Olympics. Forster has participated in seven IIHF Women's World Championships during 2012 to 2021, and won a bronze medal at the 2012 tournament.

Personal life
Forster comes from a hockey playing family. Her father, Marcel, played in the National League B (NLB) throughout the 1980s and served as assistant coach to HC Ajoie during 2011 to 2015. Her two younger siblings play ice hockey in Swiss leagues –  Gaëtan (born 1997) in the 2. Liga of the Regio League and Justine (born 2001) in the Swiss Women's Hockey League B (SWHL B).

References

External links
 
 
 

1993 births
Living people
AIK Hockey Dam players
Brynäs IF Dam players
Ice hockey players at the 2014 Winter Olympics
Ice hockey players at the 2018 Winter Olympics
Ice hockey players at the 2022 Winter Olympics
Leksands IF Dam players
Linköping HC Dam players
Medalists at the 2014 Winter Olympics
Metropolitan Riveters players
Olympic bronze medalists for Switzerland
Olympic ice hockey players of Switzerland
Olympic medalists in ice hockey
Swiss women's ice hockey defencemen
Swiss expatriate ice hockey people
Swiss expatriate sportspeople in Sweden